Robert Mwesigwa Rukaari is a Ugandan politician and legislator representing Mbarara North, Mbarara City. He is the Chairman of the East African Procurement News Company Limited, a sister company of AMPROC INC which publishes a monthly Magazine that reviews the Procurement Industry in the East African Region and has been the Honorary Consul for the Republic of Malawi in Uganda. He was also the Honorary Consul of the Kingdom of Morocco.

He also serves as a member of the Central Executive Committee of National Resistance Movement, the ruling party in Uganda.

National Resistance Movement -National Chairman, Entrepreneurship League and Member of the Central Executive Committee National Resistance Movement November 2015 – Present.

Education
Makerere University -Bachelor's degree B.A Political Science and French
Makerere University -Master's degree in Public Administration
Nkumba University -Master's in Security and Strategic Studies.
Nkumba University -Diploma Strategic Public Relations.
Nkumba University -Diploma in Business Administration and Management.

In 2019, he was appointed a Chamber Leader to serve on the International Chamber of Commerce (ICC) World Chambers Federation (WCF) General Council from 2020 to 2022 in Paris, France, a world Business Organisation, enabling World Businesses to secure prosperity and opportunity for all people in the world. He was chairman, Board of Africa Strategic Leadership Centre, a collaborative initiative of leaders from public and private sectors, committed to Africa's progress, cultivating growth opportunities and investing in the continent's human capital.

In 2021, Members of Parliament of Uganda on the Statutory Authorities and State Enterprise (COSASE) committee squeezed him to show how he acquired three plots of land that belonged to Uganda Railway Co-operation  the URC in Port Bell and Mulago at a total of Shs 357 million in 2009, which he failed to answer.

He contested with his long time Allie Tusiime Micheal in NRM primary elections whom he had sponsored in the 2016 Elections.

Controversies
Recently a family in Isingiro district petitioned the government after losing over ten billion Shillings to Robert Mwesigwa Rukaari, after their own land in Isingiro District was occupied by refugees and when the government compensated them he refused to pay their money which he convinced to pass on to his company bank account.

During the COVID-19 era, he was accused of manufacturing fake face masks that were not approved by the Uganda National Bureau of Standards, which he had opened its factory in Mbarara.

References 

Members of the Parliament of Uganda
National Resistance Movement politicians
21st-century Ugandan politicians
Mbarara District
Makerere University alumni
Living people
Year of birth missing (living people)